Cohiba may refer to:
Cohiba (cigar brand)
Cohiba (cigarette)